T. V. Somanathan (born 10 May 1965) is a 1987 batch Indian Administrative Service (IAS) officer of the Tamil Nadu cadre. He is presently the Finance Secretary of India (Department of expenditure). Earlier he was Additional Secretary and Joint Secretary in the Prime Minister's Office. Prior to this, he was working as Director at the World Bank, Washington D.C., on deputation from the Indian Administrative Service (IAS).

Education 
Somanathan holds a Ph.D. in Economics from Calcutta University, an Executive Development Program diploma from Harvard Business School, Master of Arts and Bachelor of Commerce degrees from Panjab University, and is a member of the Institute of Chartered Accountants of England & Wales, the Chartered Institute of Management Accountants, London, the Institute of Chartered Secretaries, London, the Association of Chartered Certified Accountants, London, the Institute of Company Secretaries of India and the Institute of Cost Accountants of India. He has published many articles and papers on economics, finance, governance and public policy in academic journals and in the Hindu, Business Standard, Business Line, Indian Express, Fortune India, Yojana, Kurukshetra etc.

Career 
Somanathan has served in various positions for both the Government of India and the Government of Tamil Nadu, like Secretary to Chief Minister, Managing Director of Chennai Metro Rail Corporation Ltd, Principal Secretary in Special Initiatives department and Planning & Development department, Joint Secretary in Ministry of Corporate Affairs, Additional Secretary in PMO and currently serving as Finance Secretary of India.

Publications

References 

1965 births
Living people
Indian Administrative Service officers